Dailey is an unincorporated community in Logan County, in the U.S. state of Colorado.

History
A post office called Dailey was established in 1915, and remained in operation until 1962.  The community was named after James Dailey, a railroad official.

References

Unincorporated communities in Logan County, Colorado
Unincorporated communities in Colorado